There have been several sieges known as the siege of Toulouse, among them:

Siege of Toulouse (721)
Siege of Toulouse (767)
Siege of Toulouse (864)
Siege of Toulouse (1159)
During the Albigensian Crusade:
Siege of Toulouse (1211) 
Siege of Toulouse (1216) 
Siege of Toulouse (1217–18)